The 1983 U.S. Clay Court Championships (also known as the 1983 U.S. Open Clay Courts) was a men's Grand Prix and women's Championship Series tennis tournament played on outdoor clay courts in Indianapolis in the United States. It was the 15th edition of the tournament and was held from July 31 through August 7, 1983. Jimmy Arias and Andrea Temesvári won the singles titles.

Finals

Men's singles

 Jimmy Arias defeated  Andrés Gómez 6–4, 2–6, 6–4
 It was Arias' 3rd title of the year and the 4th of his career.

Women's singles

 Andrea Temesvári defeated  Zina Garrison 6–2, 6–2
 It was Temesvári's 3rd title of the year and her career.

Men's doubles

 Mark Edmondson /  Sherwood Stewart defeated  Carlos Kirmayr /  Cássio Motta 6–3, 6–2
 It was Edmondson's 2nd title of the year and the 24th of his career. It was Stewart's 3rd title of the year and the 45th of his career.

Women's doubles

 Kathleen Horvath /  Virginia Ruzici defeated  Gigi Fernández /  Beth Herr 7–5, 6–4
 It was Horvath's 2nd title of the year and the 3rd of her career. It was Ruzici's 2nd title of the year and the 23rd of her career.

References

External links 

 
U.S. Clay Court Championships
U.S. Clay Court Championships
U.S. Clay Court Championships
U.S. Clay Court Championships
U.S. Clay Court Championships
U.S. Clay Court Championships